Gymnosteris is a small genus of flowering plants in the phlox family. These are small annual herbs which are native to the western United States. They generally lack leaves, but the bracts are large, fleshy, and leaflike.

There are two species:
Gymnosteris nudicaulis - nakedstem gymnosteris
Gymnosteris parvula - smallflower gymnosteris

External links

Jepson Manual Treatment

Polemoniaceae
Flora of North America
Polemoniaceae genera